The Air Armament Center (AAC) was an Air Force Materiel Command (AFMC) center at Eglin Air Force Base, Florida, responsible for development, acquisition, testing, and deployment of all air-delivered weapons for the U.S. Air Force.  Weapon systems maintained by the center included the Advanced Medium Range Air-to-Air Missile, High-speed anti-radiation missile, HARM Targeting System, Joint Air-to-Surface Standoff Missile, Joint Direct Attack Munition, Miniature Air-Launched Decoy, Sensor Fuzed Weapon, and the Small Diameter Bomb.
The Air Armament Center was inactivated as an AFMC center on July 18, 2012, and its functions merged into the former 96th Air Base Wing at Eglin AFB.  The new organization was renamed as the 96th Test Wing (96 TW) the same day as a subordinate command of the Air Force Test Center at Edwards Air Force Base, California.

History
On May 15, 1940, the Air Corps Specialized Flying School at Eglin Field was redesignated the Air Corps Proving Ground." It was redesignated Proving Ground Command on 1 April 1942.

In 1989, Mueller said the AAF Tactical Center was designated earlier on 16 October and that it and the subsequent AAF Center were different commands. For example, he cites AAF School of Applied Tactics, c. Mar 1942 (redesignated AAF Tactical Center, 16 Oct 1942) then AAF Center, 1 June 1945.

On 27 October 1942 the United States Army Air Forces established the Army Air Forces School of Applied Tactics at Orlando Army Air Base, Florida. The next year, it was redesignated as the Army Air Forces Tactical Center, on 16 October 1943. In the last days of the war, it was redesignated the Army Air Forces Center, and documentation of the period appears to indicate that the AAF Proving Ground Command at Eglin Field, Florida and the Army Air Forces Center at Orlando AAB were merged as Army Air Forces Center on 1 June 1945.

The Air Force Center was the planned USAF unit for the development of tactical policy and procedures. The Air Force Center was to be the succeeding unit to the USAAF Army Air Forces Tactical Center, established on October 28, 1943, and which had become the Army Air Forces Center on 1 June 1945. Instead, the AAF Center merged into Proving Ground Command (PGC) to form a new Army Air Forces Proving Ground Command on 8 March 1946. The AAF PGC was redesignated the Air Proving Ground Command on 10 July 1946, and raised to major command status. The APGC was moved to the now renamed Eglin Air Force Base, Florida, on 1 July 1948.

Testing of weapons

APGC conducted realistic testing of new weapons as an independent organization, reporting directly to the Chief of Staff of the Air Force and advocating a "fly-before-buy" approach to acquiring new systems. Such a shift, however, remained a challenge, for the Air Force continued the "buy-fly-fix" process that had grown from the demands of the Second World War and undervalued the importance of timely independent operational test and evaluation.

APGC attempted to simulate combat conditions during its tests. It also grew in size as it acquired the systems it tested. By 1956, Air Force regulations outlined an eight-phase test and evaluation process that did not include the APGC until phase seven. By that point in the acquisition cycle, the Air Force had often already fielded units with new systems that APGC had not yet tested. Not surprisingly, operators often experienced serious problems with these new, untested systems. This led to a misperception about the value of operational test and evaluation (OT&E) and APGC. Had OT&E taken place before production decisions and fielding new systems, there likely would not have been any question about the added value of independent OT&E.

As a result of the doubts about the value of APGC and cuts to the defense budget, in 1957 the Air Force stripped APGC of its major command status, reduced its budget and authorized personnel, and redesignated the Command the Air Proving Ground Center, and assigned it to the Air Research and Development Command. This action meant the Air Force no longer had an independent organization that specialized in impartial operational test and evaluation.

Decentralized operational testing at the major commands occurred from 1958 to 1973. Major command emphasis was often on quick deployment rather than thorough testing and impartial evaluations. Although the Air Force streamlined OT&E from eight to three phases during this period, OT&E still came at the end of the acquisition process. In addition, as systems became more complex, and the Air Force moved to acquire systems quickly, the "fly-before-buy" approach fell by the wayside. The consequences became clear when a Department of Defense study found that 21 of 22 major weapons systems used in the Vietnam War from 1965 to 1970 suffered severe operational deficiencies. These results strongly stated the case for independent OT&E in the Air Force.

The AAC was a focal point for the acquisition of advanced weapons systems. The center carried out scientific research, system management, production, operational performance, business management, requirements definition, customer and engineering support, technology planning, materiel identification, and field support activities.

While "fly-before-buy" has repeatedly proven its worth in thorough testing of systems and avoidance of later problems, the Air Force even in the twenty-first century remains severely hampered by a "buy-fly-fix" approach. Literally billions of dollars have been spent in making weapons systems operational after they have entered squadron service. For example, the Rockwell B-1B Lancer suffered repeated such problems. When declared operational, apart from nuclear weapons, the only conventional weapon the B-1 could use were free-fall bombs.

Structure through 2010

To accomplish its mission the Air Armament Center commanded three wings through 2010.

The 46th Test Wing conducted test and evaluation of all air-delivered weapons, navigation and guidance systems, Command and Control (C2) systems, and Air Force Special Operations Command systems.  The 46th Test Wing was inactivated 18 July 2012. Effectively merged to become 96th Test Wing.
The 96th Air Base Wing provided installation support for all Eglin Air Force Base tenant units.  The 96th Air Base Wing was redesignated 18 July 2012. Effectively merged to become 96th Test Wing.
The 308th Armament Systems Wing was responsible for the development, procurement, deployment, and sustainment of air-based weaponry including the Joint Direct Attack Munition (JDAM), Joint Air-to-Surface Standoff Missile (JASSM), Small Diameter Bomb (SDB), Sensor Fuzed Weapon (SFW), Wind Corrected Munitions Dispenser (WCMD), Advanced Medium Range Air-to-Air Missile (AMRAAM), Miniature Air-Launched Decoy (MALD).  The 308th Armament Systems Wing was inactivated in 2010 and became the Armament Systems Directorate.

Lineage
 Established as Army Air Forces School of Applied Tactics on 27 October 1942, with major command status
 Redesignated: Army Air Forces Tactical Center on 16 October 1943
 Redesignated: Army Air Forces Center on 1 June 1945
 Redesignated: Army Air Forces Proving Ground Command on 8 March 1946
 Redesignated: Air Proving Ground Command on 10 July 1946
 Redesignated: Air Proving Ground, 20 January 1948, losing major command status
 Regained major command status, 1 June 1948
 Redesignated: Air Proving Ground Command on 29 December 1951
 Redesignated: Air Proving Ground Center on 1 December 1957, losing major command status
 Redesignated: Armament Development and Test Center on 1 August 1968
 Redesignated: Armament Division on 1 October 1979
 Redesignated: Munitions Systems Division on 15 March 1989
 Redesignated: Air Force Development Test Center on 11 July 1990
 Redesignated: Air Armament Center on 1 October 1998
 Inactivated on 1 October 2012

Assignments
 United States Army Air Forces, 27 October 1942
 Air Materiel Command, 20 January 1948
 United States Air Force, 1 June 1948
 Air Research and Development Command (later Air Force Systems Command), 1 December 1957
 Air Force Materiel Command, 1 July 1992 – 1 October 2012 (attached to Air Force Life Cycle Management Center after 18 July 2012)

Components
3200th Proof Test Group, 1948-1950s
3206th Proof Test Group
Others

Stations
 Orlando Army Air Base, Florida, 27 October 1952
 Eglin Field (later Air Force Base), Florida, 8 March 1946 – 1 October 2012

Notes

External links

Military units and formations in Florida
Centers of the United States Air Force
Test and evaluation units and formations of the United States Air Force